Lindsay Wildlife Experience, formerly known as Lindsay Wildlife Museum, is a family museum and wildlife rehabilitation center in  Walnut Creek, California. Lindsay is the first wildlife hospital established in the United States, and a popular family museum in the San Francisco East Bay Area. Founded in Walnut Creek in 1955, the museum's programs "connect people with wildlife to inspire responsibility and respect for the world we share." The museum features a number of California wildlife exhibits, natural history specimens, and a special theater offering a look into one of the hospital's many wildlife treatment rooms. The rehabilitation center—still among the largest in the country—treats more than 5,000 injured, sick, or orphaned wild animals each year.

History
Lindsay Wildlife Museum was founded in 1955 by Alexander Lindsay as the Diablo Junior Museum. It became the Alexander Lindsay Junior Museum in 1962 after Alexander Lindsay died at 44. In 1965 it moved to a water-pump house in Larkey Park in Walnut Creek. In 1970 the museum started the first formal wildlife rehabilitation program in the United States. In 1986 the City of Walnut Creek ended operations and the museum became an independently operated not-for-profit organization. The next year "Junior" was dropped from the title, making it the Lindsay Museum. In 1993 the museum moved to a newly built  museum near the old pump house. Three years later the name was changed to Lindsay Wildlife Museum. In recent years, the museum has added a number of major new exhibits. Wildlife Hospital Behind the Scenes lets visitors watch a live veterinary procedure at the hospital through a large, one-way window. At Raptors visitors can soar virtually over Mount Diablo and measure their armspan against raptors' wingspans. At Hive Alive! and Hive to Honey~Honey Bees and Beekeepers at Work visitors can watch thousands of live bees and their queen and learn what jobs different bees do. In fall 2013, the museum opened the new exhibit The Burrow where visitors can go "underground" to discover the world of wildlife beneath their feet. The museum changed its name to Lindsay Wildlife Experience in 2015.

Hospital

The wildlife rehabilitation hospital at the museum receives more than 5,000 California native wild animal patients every year. The hospital is a pioneer in wildlife rehabilitation and many now-standard protocols across the country were developed here. Hospital staff and volunteers treat animals that have been poisoned, struck by automobiles, fallen from trees during trimming, and injured by other often human-related activities. They also care for orphaned young, both onsite and at the homes of specially trained volunteers. After being treated, an animal is released back into the wild. If it cannot be safely released, it may join the museum as a resident "animal ambassador". As many animals brought to the hospital are cat-caught, the museum strongly encourages visitors to keep their cats indoors.

Animal ambassadors

Lindsay Wildlife Experience specializes in the care of animals unable to return to the wild. Of the 70 animals that call Lindsay Wildlife home, nearly all of them have a physical, psychological, or behavioral problem that would make them unable to survive in the wild. All of the animals that live at Lindsay Wildlife Experience serve as animal ambassadors and educate the public on conservation and natural history. Some animals are on view to the public; others live off-exhibit and are brought out for presentations, classes, tours, and private animal encounters.

Amphibians
 California tiger salamander

Birds
 Acorn woodpecker
 American kestrel
 Bald eagle
 Band-tailed pigeon
 Barn owl
 Barred owl
 Golden eagle
 Great grey owl
 Great horned owl
 Greater roadrunner
 Harris's hawk
 Mourning dove
 Peregrine falcon
 Red-shouldered hawk
 Red-tailed hawk
 Swainson's hawk
 Turkey vulture
 Western screech owl
 White-tailed kite

Mammals
 Domestic rabbit
 Domestic rat
 Ground squirrel
 Guinea pig
 Mexican free-tailed bat
 North American porcupine
 Virginia opossum

Reptiles
 Aquatic garter snake
 California kingsnake
 California mountain kingsnake
 Common chuckwalla
 Desert iguana
 Pacific gopher snake
 Northern alligator lizard
 Southern alligator lizard
 Western pond turtle

Invertebrates
 Banana slug
 Black widow spider
 Cactus longhorn beetle
 Chilean rose tarantula
 Desert blond tarantula
 Desert hairy scorpion
 Desert millipede
 Madagascar hissing cockroach
 Wolf spider

References

External links

Institutions accredited by the American Alliance of Museums
Wildlife rehabilitation and conservation centers
Nature centers in California
Walnut Creek, California
Museums in Contra Costa County, California
Natural history museums in California